Walter Rice Evans (10 September 1863 – 9 June 1909) was a Welsh international rugby union player, who won three caps between 1890 and 1891.

Life
Evans was born in Neath, Glamorgan. He was educated at Cowbridge Grammar School and Jesus College, Oxford, playing for Oxford University RFC and winning a "Blue" in 1890.

He was a forward and represented the Wales national rugby union team on three occasions in the Home Nations Championship. His debut for Wales was on 1 February 1890 against Scotland. In the following season, he played against England and Scotland.

He also played for Swansea (for whom he made his debut in 1889), Neath and London Welsh. He died on 9 June 1909.

References

1863 births
1909 deaths
Alumni of Jesus College, Oxford
London Welsh RFC players
Neath RFC players
Oxford University RFC players
Rugby union forwards
Rugby union players from Neath
Swansea RFC players
Wales international rugby union players
Welsh rugby union players